A hierarchical database model is a data model in which the data are organized into a tree-like structure. The data are stored as records which are connected to one another through links. A record is a collection of fields, with each field containing only one value. The  type of a record defines which fields the record contains.

The hierarchical database model mandates that each child record has only one parent, whereas each parent record can have one or more child records. In order to retrieve data from a hierarchical database, the whole tree needs to be traversed starting from the root node. This model is recognized as the first database model created by IBM in the 1960s.

History 
The hierarchical structure was developed by IBM in the 1960s and used in early mainframe DBMS.  Records' relationships form a treelike model.  This structure is simple but inflexible because the relationship is confined to a one-to-many relationship.  The IBM Information Management System (IMS) and the RDM Mobile are examples of a hierarchical database system with multiple hierarchies over the same data.  RDM Mobile is a newly designed embedded database for a mobile computer system. 

The hierarchical data model lost traction as Codd's relational model became the de facto standard used by virtually all mainstream database management systems. A relational-database implementation of a hierarchical model was first discussed in published form in 1992 (see also nested set model). Hierarchical data organization schemes resurfaced with the advent of XML in the late 1990s (see also XML database).  The hierarchical structure is used primarily today for storing geographic information and file systems.

Currently, hierarchical databases are still widely used especially in applications that require very high performance and availability such as banking, health care, and telecommunications. One of the most widely used commercial hierarchical databases is IMS.
Another example of the use of hierarchical databases is Windows Registry in the Microsoft Windows operating systems.

Examples of hierarchical data represented as relational tables 
An organization could store employee information in a table that contains attributes/columns such as employee number, first name, last name, and department number.  The organization provides each employee with computer hardware as needed, but computer equipment may only be used by the employee to which it is assigned.  The organization could store the computer hardware information in a separate table that includes each part's serial number, type, and the employee that uses it.  The tables might look like this:

In this model, the employee data table represents the "parent" part of the hierarchy, while the computer table represents the "child" part of the hierarchy.
In contrast to tree structures usually found in computer software algorithms, in this model the children point to the parents.
As shown, each employee may possess several pieces of computer equipment, but each individual piece of computer equipment may have only one employee owner.

Consider the following structure:

In this, the "child" is the same type as the "parent". The hierarchy stating EmpNo 10 is boss of 20, and 30 and 40 each report to 20 is represented by the "ReportsTo" column. In Relational database terms, the ReportsTo column is a foreign key referencing the EmpNo column. If the "child" data type were different, it would be in a different table, but there would still be a foreign key referencing the EmpNo column of the employees table.

This simple model is commonly known as the adjacency list model and was introduced by Dr. Edgar F. Codd after initial criticisms surfaced that the relational model could not model hierarchical data. However, the model is only a special case of a general adjacency list for a graph.

See also 
 Tree structure
 Hierarchical query
 Hierarchical clustering

References

External links 

 Troels' links to Hierarchical data in RDBMSs
 Managing Hierarchical Data in MySQL (This page is from archive.org as the page has been removed from MySQL.com)
 Hierarchical data in MySQL: parents and children in one query
 Create Hierarchy Chart from Hierarchical Database

Database models